Ginnette del Rosario Selmo (born May 12, 1986 in Santo Domingo) is a retired volleyball player from the 
Dominican Republic, who participated with the women's national team at the 2007 World Cup in Japan. She competed as  a middle blocker.   Ginnette is the twin sister of Gina del Rosario.

Beach volley
Along with her twin sister, Gina, she played at the NORCECA Beach Volleyball Circuit in 2008 and 2009.

Clubs
 Deportivo Nacional (2003)
 Los Prados (2005)
 Deportivo Nacional (2007)
 Distrito Nacional (2008)

References

External links
 FIVB profile
 
 

1986 births
Living people
Dominican Republic beach volleyball players
Dominican Republic women's volleyball players
Twin sportspeople
Dominican Republic twins
Women's beach volleyball players
Middle blockers